Wenchuan Earthquake Memorial is a memorial site located at the ancient town of Anren in Dayi County, Sichuan, China following the devastating Wenchuan Earthquake on 12 May 2008 in Sichuan Province of China. The memorial is built on the site of the Beichuan Middle School which collapsed killing more than 1000 pupils and teachers inside.

History

Built and Designed by Atelier Li Xinggang it is one of the single buildings among the non-governmental funded Jianchuan museum cluster. The museum was originally designed to collect and exhibit mirrors from the Cultural Revolution of China. After the Wenchuan Earthquake, it was redesigned into a composite museum in which Wenchuan Earthquake relics and the relevant artworks are exhibited in the form of a “Shocking Diary”.

References

Monuments and memorials in China